Walking with... is a palaeontology media franchise produced and broadcast by the BBC Natural History Unit. The franchise began with the critically acclaimed series Walking with Dinosaurs (1999), created by Tim Haines. By far the most watched science programme in British television history, Walking with Dinosaurs spawned numerous companion material and four sequel series: Walking with Beasts (2001), Walking with Cavemen (2003), Sea Monsters (2003) and Walking with Monsters (2005). Each series uses a combination of computer-generated imagery and animatronics, incorporated with live action footage shot at various locations, to portray prehistoric animals in the style of a traditional nature documentary.

The Walking with... programmes were praised for their special effects and for their science communication. Though largely praised by scientists for the effort to adhere to science and for portraying prehistoric life as animals rather than movie monsters, some academic criticism has been leveled at the series for not making clear through their narration what is speculative and what is based in fact.

In addition to the five main series, the success of Walking with... also led to the production of the Walking with Dinosaurs special episodes The Ballad of Big Al, The Giant Claw and Land of Giants. The franchise has also been accompanied by several books, merchandise, video games and the live theatrical show Walking with Dinosaurs − The Arena Spectacular. In 2013, a movie based on Walking with Dinosaurs, with the same name, was directed by Neil Nightingale and Barry Cook.

Development 

Walking with Dinosaurs was devised by the then BBC-employed science television producer Tim Haines in 1996. Inspired by the 1993 film Jurassic Park, Haines envisioned a more science-based documentary programme using the same techniques as Jurassic Park to bring dinosaurs to life. Though such a series was initially feared to be far too expensive to produce, particularly considering the production costs of Jurassic Park, Haines managed to bring down the costs through working with the award-winning UK-based graphics company Framestore. It was only after the production of a six-minute pilot episode in 1997 that Haines managed to secure funding for the series; Walking with Dinosaurs was funded by the BBC, BBC Worldwide and the Discovery Channel, alongside major investments from TV Asahi in Japan and ProSieben in Germany. At a cost of £6.1 million ($9.9 million), Walking with Dinosaurs cost over £37,654 ($61,112) per minute to produce, making it the most expensive documentary series per minute ever made. The visual effects of Walking with Dinosaurs were done by Framestore and the puppets and animatronics were done by the special effects company Crawley Creatures.

The success of Walking with Dinosaurs led to the rapid creation of Walking with... as a brand of documentary series. In the aftermath of Walking with Dinosaurs, Haines founded the production company Impossible Pictures together with Jasper James, one of the producers on Walking with Dinosaurs.

2000 saw the release of a special episode of Dinosaurs, The Ballad of Big Al, focusing on a single Allosaurus specimen. The first entire sequel series released in 2001: Walking with Beasts, which explored the life of the Cenozoic, after the age of the dinosaurs. Like Walking with Dinosaurs before it, Beasts was the idea of Haines. Haines wished to introduce the general public to the assortment of animals of the Cenozoic, typically less represented in popular culture than the dinosaurs. Haines served as executive producer on the series, with James and Nigel Paterson producing and directing. Beasts was in terms of effects more challenging to produce than Dinosaurs, owing to mammals having features such as fur, whiskers, eyebrows and various floppy parts absent in dinosaurs, and to audiences being more familiar with how mammals move and act and thus better at spotting mistakes.

In late 2002 and early 2003, further special episodes of Dinosaurs were broadcast: Land of Giants and The Giant Claw. These sepcials starred wildlife presenter Nigel Marven as a "time-traveling zoologist". Marven's inclusion was mainly so that audiences would have a better understanding of the scale of the animals shown. While Haines, James and Impossible Pictures worked on Land of Giants and The Giant Claw, the BBC produced a further series without their involvement: Walking with Cavemen, also broadcast in 2003. Cavemen acted as a sequel to Beasts, exploring human evolution. The series was created by Richard Dale and Peter Georgi, both of whom had previously worked together on documentaries such as The Human Body, and starred Robert Winston as a presenter. The success of Land of Giants and The Giant Claw led to the creation of Sea Monsters, broadcast in 2003, a miniseries exploring the "seven deadliest seas of all time", once again starring Marven.

The series Space Odyssey (2004), produced by Haines and James at Impossible Pictures together with BBC Worldwide, the Discovery Channel and ProSieben, was originally going to be titled Walking with Spacemen. Both executives of the BBC and ProSieben heralded Walking with Spacemen as the logical next step in the series, following on from the journey began with Walking with Dinosaurs, Beasts and Cavemen. Space Odyssey used special effects and techniques from the Walking with... documentaries to speculate how astronauts may explore the various planets in the Solar System on crewed missions. Despite the title change, Space Odyssey has at times been referred to as Walking with Spacemen also after its release and the old title was used in some of the companion material, including as the title of the earliest editions of the companion book, co-authored by Haines and Christopher Riley.

Instead of a futuristic series, Haines and Impossible Pictures decided to round off the Walking with... series by making a programme on the before then largely underutilized Paleozoic era, set before the dinosaurs. Walking with Monsters, broadcast in 2005, utilized the most sophisticated effects of the entire franchise, owing to advancements in technology by the time of its production.

Framestore and Crawley Creatures returned to do the computer graphics and animatronics, respectively, for every successor series, with the sole exception of Walking with Cavemen, which involved Framestore but not Crawley Creatures. The practical effects of Walking with Cavemen were done by several companies, including Altered States FX, Animated Extras and BGFX. After the release of Monsters, Impossible Pictures, Framestore and the others involved were effectively forced to move on from documentary filmmaking and produce other series like Primeval (2007–2011) due to companies and executives losing interest in funding fact-based documentaries on prehistoric life.

Television series

Walking with Dinosaurs (1999) 
Envisioned as the first "Natural History of Dinosaurs" and a series that would provide viewers with "a window into a lost world", Walking with Dinosaurs explores life in the Mesozoic era, particularly dinosaurs, in the format of a traditional nature documentary.

Specials (2000–2003) 
The first special episode of Walking with Dinosaurs to be released was The Ballad of Big Al (2000). Big Al follows a single Allosaurus specimen nicknamed "Big Al" whose life story has been reconstructed based on a well-preserved fossil of the same name. The two later specials, The Giant Claw (2002) and Land of Giants (2003), star "time-travelling zoologist" Nigel Marven as he travels back in time to encounter and interact with prehistoric life.

Walking with Beasts (2001) 
Walking with Beasts follows Walking with Dinosaurs in showcasing prehistoric life in a nature documentary style. Beasts tracks animal life, particularly the rise of the mammals to dominance, in the Cenozoic era. The series also gives some insight into human evolution, with an episode devoted to Australopithecus and appearances by both Neanderthals and anatomically modern humans.

Walking with Cavemen (2003) 
Walking with Cavemen follows Walking with Dinosaurs and Walking with Beasts in adopting the same nature documentary style, though this time involving presenter Robert Winston. Cavemen follows the story of human evolution through exploring key developments on the path from Australopithecus afarensis to modern humans. The programme often focuses on particular characters and their relationships to each other in order to be more accessible to viewers.

Sea Monsters (2003) 
Sea Monsters once again stars Nigel Marven as a "time-traveling zoologist" who this time travels to seven different periods of time in prehistory, diving in the "seven deadliest seas of all time" and encountering and interacting with the prehistoric creatures who inhabit them.

Walking with Monsters (2005) 
Serving as a prequel series to Walking with Dinosaurs, Walking with Monsters explores the prehistoric life of the Paleozoic era. The series focuses on "the struggle for the survival of the fittest", using stories of individual animals to cast the Palaeozoic as a long "war" between various animal groups for dominance, some of which are described within the context of the series as being distantly related to humans.

Reception

Accolades

Viewership 
Walking with Dinosaurs was broadcast to record audiences in 1999 and is sometimes considered the biggest science documentary series ever created. With 15 million viewers viewing the first episode on 4 October 1999 and another 3.91 million viewing it on its repeat the Sunday afterwards, Walking with Dinosaurs is by far the most watched science programme in British television history. Viewership figuers steadily declined for later series; the first airing of the first episode of Walking with Beasts in 2001 had around 8 million viewers and the first airing of the first episode of Walking with Monsters in 2005 attracted 4.57 million viewers.

The ratings shown below are 7-day data, including both the original airings of the episodes and their repeats some days later. There is only data for the top 30 programmes in terms of viewers; episodes labeled N/A failed to reach the top 30 programmes during their airings.

Prehistoric Planet 

Prehistoric Planet is a revision of Walking with Dinosaurs and Walking with Beasts, done by Discovery Channel and NBC for the Discovery Kids network in 2002–2003. Though the producers kept most of the original animation, David Bock and Peter Sherman wrote new text for a younger target audience, narrated by Ben Stiller (in Season 1) and Christian Slater (in Season 2), and interspersed the scenes with occasional quizzes to act as bumpers around the commercial breaks. New music was incorporated as well. Most marketing and advertising for the series focused on the dinosaur episodes. In addition, the final episode, Prehistoric Planet Top 10, focused solely on the creatures from Walking with Dinosaurs.

Books

Companion books 
The first four Walking with... series were accompanied with companion books. These books were coffee table books exploring the settings from each series in detail, with scientific information, facts and narratives similar to those shown on screen. All of the books were lavishly illustrated with stills from the episodes. All of the Walking with... companion books were well received.

 Walking with Dinosaurs: A Natural History (1999), by Tim Haines
 Walking with Beasts: A Prehistoric Safari (2001), by Tim Haines
 Walking with Cavemen: Stand Eye-to-Eye with your Ancestors (2003), by John Lynch and Louise Barrett
 Sea Monsters: Prehistoric Predators of the Deep (2003), by Nigel Marven and Jasper James

Other books 
Walking with Monsters was not accompanied by a companion book, instead the series was in 2006 accompanied by the book The Complete Guide to Prehistoric Life, an encyclopedia and reference work with images from the entire franchise, co-authored by Haines and Paul Chambers. In addition to the companion books and The Complete Guide to Prehistoric Life, several other books have been released to accompany the different series. Walking with Dinosaurs was in addition to its companion book also accompanied by Walking with Dinosaurs: The Evidence (2000) by David Martill and Darren Naish and Walking with Dinosaurs: The Facts (2000) by Michael Benton, both books serving to corroborate the science behind the series. Among the various children's books that have been released alongside the Walking with... documentaries is a children's book adaptation of The Ballad of Big Al by Stephen Cole, titled Allosaurus! The Life and Death of Big Al, as well as 3D albums, sticker albums and photo journals for both Walking with Dinosaurs and Walking with Beasts.

Electronic media 
With the exception of Walking with Monsters, all of the Walking with... series launched with accompanying websites. The original 1999 Walking with Dinosaurs website was considered innovative for the time and included scientific information, fact files, glossaries, as well as games and puzzles. The content of the websites of following series was similar, offering both accompanying scientific information and games.

In addition to the games on the website, full Walking with... games have also been developed. The first such game was the freeware video game Dinosaur World, developed by Asylum Entertainment and published by the BBC Imagineering in June 2001. Dinosaur World is an adaptation of The Ballad of Big Al where players try to find various animals and plants. The game was never finished but could be downloaded from the BBC website in its alpha form. There was also a video game adaptation of Walking with Beasts, Walking with Beasts: Operation Salvage, developed by Absolute Studios and published by BBC Worldwide Ltd. in 2001. Operation Salvage is a top-down shooter where players travel back in time to observe animals and fight time-traveling enemies. Another Walking with Dinosaurs game was released in 2013, titled simply Walking with Dinosaurs, to accompany the film adaptation of the series released that year. Walking with Dinosaurs is an augmented reality game developed by Supermassive Games in collaboration with the BBC.

Notes

References 

 
Television franchises
British television documentaries
Documentary films about prehistoric life
Documentary films about science
Documentary television shows about evolution